Hamilton Glover Ewart (October 23, 1849 – April 28, 1918) was a United States representative from North Carolina and a United States district judge of the United States District Court for the Western District of North Carolina.

Education and career

Born on October 23, 1849, in Columbia, Richland County, South Carolina, Ewart attended private schools and moved with his parents to Hendersonville, Henderson County, North Carolina in 1862. He received a Bachelor of Laws in 1876 from the University of South Carolina School of Law. He was admitted to the bar and commenced practice in Hendersonville in 1870. He was a Referee in Bankruptcy for the United States District Court for the Western District of North Carolina starting in 1872. He was a delegate to the 1876 Republican National Convention. He was the Mayor of Hendersonville from 1878 to 1879. He was a member of the North Carolina House of Representatives from 1887 to 1889, and from 1895 to 1897.

Congressional service

Ewart was elected as a Republican from North Carolina's 9th congressional district to the United States House of Representatives of the 51st United States Congress and served from March 4, 1889, to March 3, 1891. He was an unsuccessful candidate for reelection in 1890 to the 52nd United States Congress and for election in 1904.

State judicial service

After his departure from Congress, Ewart served as a Judge of the Henderson County Criminal Court from 1895 to 1896. He was a Judge of the North Carolina Superior Court for the Twelfth Judicial District from 1897 to 1898.

Federal judicial service

Ewart was nominated by President McKinley to the United States District Court for the Western District of North Carolina on January 27, 1898, but the United States Senate never voted on his nomination.

Ewart received a recess appointment from President William McKinley on July 13, 1898, to a seat on the United States District Court for the Western District of North Carolina vacated by Judge Robert P. Dick. He was nominated to the same position by President McKinley on December 13, 1898. His service terminated on March 3, 1899, after his nomination was not confirmed by the United States Senate, which never voted on his nomination. Ewart received a second recess appointment from President McKinley on April 13, 1899, to the seat vacated by himself. He was nominated to the same position by President McKinley on December 19, 1899. His service terminated on June 7, 1900, after his nomination was not confirmed by the Senate, which never voted on his nomination.

Later career and death

Following his departure from the federal bench, Ewart resumed private practice in Hendersonville. He was a member of the North Carolina House of Representatives from 1911 to 1913. He continued private practice in Chicago, Illinois from 1916 to 1918. He died on April 28, 1918, in Chicago. He was interred in Oakdale Cemetery in Hendersonville.

See also
 Unsuccessful recess appointments to United States federal courts

References

Sources
 
 

1849 births
1918 deaths
Lawyers from Chicago
Lawyers from Columbia, South Carolina
North Carolina lawyers
Judges of the United States District Court for the Western District of North Carolina
Mayors of places in North Carolina
Republican Party members of the North Carolina House of Representatives
United States federal judges appointed by William McKinley
Unsuccessful recess appointments to United States federal courts
Republican Party members of the United States House of Representatives from North Carolina
19th-century American politicians
University of South Carolina alumni